Charlie Stone may refer to:

 Charlie Stone (politician) (born 1948), member of the Florida House of Representatives
 Charlie Stone (rugby league) (1950–2018), English rugby league footballer of the 1970s and 1980s 
 Charlie Stone, a character in the TV series Veronica Mars